Cecil B. Demented is a 2000 black comedy film written and directed by John Waters. The film stars Melanie Griffith as a snobby A-list Hollywood actress who is kidnapped by a band of terrorist filmmakers; they force her to star in their underground film. Stephen Dorff stars as the eponymous character and leader of the group, with Alicia Witt, Adrian Grenier, Michael Shannon, and Maggie Gyllenhaal co-starring as the rest of his gang of filmmakers.

The film, whose title (also the name of Dorff's character) alludes to director Cecil B. DeMille, is loosely based on the 1974 kidnapping of Patricia Hearst, who has a cameo role. Like all of Waters' films, it was shot in Baltimore, Maryland. The film was given a limited theatrical release on August 11, 2000, by Artisan Entertainment.

Plot
Hollywood A-list actress Honey Whitlock publicly presents herself as a sweet and considerate woman, but is actually a profane, unreasonable, and demanding diva. While in Baltimore to attend a premiere, Honey is kidnapped by the manic film director, Cecil B. Demented, and his band of misfit, Andy Warhol–worshiping artists who have branded themselves "kamikaze filmmakers", going by the group name "SprocketHoles". Each of the SprocketHoles has infiltrated the staff of the theater where the premiere is to take place; they subsequently kidnap Honey as she concludes her remarks on stage. In the ensuing mayhem, the group escapes.

Honey is taken to an abandoned movie theater where she is kept gagged with tape on her mouth, tied up and blindfolded. Honey is introduced to Cecil's crew of followers, each of whom wears a tattoo of a noted filmmaker and reveals unique, individual quirks. Cecil explains that he wants to make his masterpiece film and needs Honey to star as the lead. At first she resists, shooting scenes emotionlessly, but when Cecil demands better results, Honey gives an over-the-top performance in the film's opening scene which pleases him. Apart from the first scene, Cecil, Honey and the crew roam around the city filming scenes at real (unapproved) locations, often involving innocent bystanders in the process.

The group's first location is a movie theater playing Patch Adams: The Director's Cut, which they storm with guns and smoke bombs before leaving with their footage. Several bystanders note in interviews that Honey seems younger and cooler than in her recent Hollywood films, but a spokesman for the Baltimore Film Commission "says no to cinema terrorism". Inspired, Cecil decides to invade the luncheon the commission is hosting. The group crashes the event and Cecil orders Honey to jump off the roof of a nearby building, which she does without safety measures. A gunfight ensues between Cecil's crew and the police, during which Rodney the hairdresser is killed and Cecil is wounded. Honey uses the opportunity to turn herself in to the authorities and they take her away in a police car, but the film group retrieves her soon after.

As Honey seems to become more comfortable with her situation, possibly developing Stockholm syndrome, she watches a television special discussing her disappearance. Persons who knew her, including her ex-husband, are interviewed and come clean about how mean-spirited she was in daily life. Honey now realizes that her desire to escape would only lead her back to Hollywood, where she is hated for being rude. She resists the idea of joining Cecil's followers but soon reconsiders and declares herself "Demented forever", burning a brand into her arm and officially joining the motley crew.

The SprocketHoles then invade the set of the Forrest Gump sequel being filmed in Baltimore, at Honey's suggestion. Upon arrival, they subdue and replace many of the film's crew. A gunfight breaks out between Cecil's friends and Teamsters who got free. Members of Cecil's crew are either killed or wounded. The surviving SprocketHoles and Honey flee to a nearby pornographic theater and seek refuge inside. The audience helps Cecil escape.

At their last location, Cecil is shooting the final scene at a local drive-in while law enforcement are alerted. Cecil and the crew invade the projection room, and he proceeds to excite the crowd into a frenzy. He asks Honey to light her hair on fire for the final shot (which she does). With the film finished, the SprocketHoles start having sex in public before the authorities step in. Cecil sets himself completely ablaze as police arrive, to give Honey a chance to escape. In the ensuing chaos, some crew members escape with the raw film footage while others are shot. Taken into custody, she is surprised and pleased by the new affection that the crowd has shown to her as she is put into the police van.

Cast

*Denote the director's name tattooed on the characters.

Release
The film was screened out of competition at the 2000 Cannes Film Festival on May 17, 2000. It was released in the United States on August 11 of that year.

Reception
Roger Ebert gave the film one and a half stars out of four, remarking that it was like "a home movie [with] a bunch of kids goofing off", while others such as Peter Travers of Rolling Stone said "DeMented is Waters the way we like him—spiked with laughs and served with a twist".

The review aggregator Rotten Tomatoes reported that 53% of critics gave Cecil B. Demented positive reviews, based on 80 reviews, with a weighted average of 5.56/10. The site's consensus states "The idea behind John Waters' latest has much potential, but the movie ends up being too sloppy and underdeveloped in terms of script and direction. Also, by today's standards, it fails to shock." Metacritic reported the film had an average score of 57 out of 100, based on 32 reviews.

In more recent years, the film has been reappraised by some critics. In 2020, A.S. Hamrah wrote The Baffler, "Seen today, Cecil B. Demented is hilarious, cheap, and necessary. A series of low-budget set pieces, the film mocks all aspects of film production, bemoaning the loss of trash to blockbuster entertainment, exhorting young filmmakers across America to form queer families and blow things up." In 2021, Will Sloan wrote in Screen Slate, "As a filmmaker, Waters’s flaws and virtues are so densely intertwined as to be indistinguishable. His actors are mostly just mouthpieces for his ideas, but if you can accept a universe in which the baby-faced likes of Adrian Grenier, Alicia Witt, and Maggie Gyllenhaal can’t stop talking about Pasolini, the ideas are as stimulating as ever." In 2022, Scout Tafoya wrote on RogerEbert.com, "Cecil B. Demented may lack some of the immediacy of Waters' early experiments in transgression, but it's one of his most personal statements."

Box office
Cecil B. Demented was a box office failure, grossing $2 million from an estimated $10 million budget.

Soundtrack
The soundtrack was released August 8, 2000 by RCA Records.
 "Opening Credit Theme" – Moby
 "Nice Tranquil Thumbs in Mouth" – The Locust
 "Bankable Bitch" – DJ Class and Teflon the Bull
 "Upstart" – Meatjack
 "Everyday" – Substance D
 "No Budget" – DJ Class and Mayo
 "Broadway Brouhaha"
 "Loopy" – XXXBombshell
 "An Extra Piece of Dead Meat" – The Locust
 "Demented Forever" – Karen McMillan
 "Seduction" – The Sex-o-Rama Band
 "Ciao!" – Liberace
 "Chow" – Jerome Dillon

See also
 List of American films of 2000

References

External links

 
 
 
 

2000 films
2000 black comedy films
2000s crime comedy films
2000 independent films
2000 LGBT-related films
2000s comedy thriller films
English-language French films
French black comedy films
French crime thriller films
French LGBT-related films
American black comedy films
American comedy thriller films
American crime comedy films
American LGBT-related films
2000s English-language films
Films scored by Basil Poledouris
Films directed by John Waters
Films about kidnapping
Films about actors
Films about filmmaking
Films set in Baltimore
Films shot in Baltimore
American independent films
LGBT-related black comedy films
Artisan Entertainment films
Lionsgate films
2000 comedy films
Films set in a movie theatre
2000s American films
2000s French films